One Dreamer (foaled 1988 in Florida) is a retired American Thoroughbred racehorse best known for winning the 1994 Breeders' Cup Distaff.

Background
One Dreamer was bred and raced by the Glen Hill Farm of Ocala, Florida, owned by Leonard H. Lavin, the founding owner of Alberto-Culver beauty-care products company. The filly was trained by Tom Proctor,

Racing career
One Dreamer did not race at age two and finished off the board in her one start at age three. During the next three years of racing, though, she made eight starts annually and won four each time. Her six-year-old campaign in 1994 culminated with the most important win of her career when she won the Breeders' Cup Distaff at odds of 47-1, defeating a strong field that included Heavenly Prize, Hollywood Wildcat, and Sky Beauty.

Breeding record
Retired to broodmare duty at her owner's Glen Hill farm, One Dreamer has produced seven foals from notable sires, such as Storm Cat and Unbridled, but they have had limited success in racing.

References

1988 racehorse births
Racehorses bred in Florida
Racehorses trained in the United States
Breeders' Cup Distaff winners
Thoroughbred family 12-b
Godolphin Arabian sire line